The Yeoheung Min clan is a Korean clan that traces its origin to Yeoju, Gyeonggi Province. The 2015 Korean Census counted 167,124 members of the Yeoheung Min clan.

Origin 
The Yeoheung Min clan's progenitor was Min Ching-do (민칭도, 閔稱道) who settled down in Goryeo after coming to the country as an emissary from the Song Dynasty. Min Ching-do was said to be a descendant of Min Sun, the second disciple of Confucius.

It was also said that in a poem written to Min Sik (민식, 閔湜), by Yi Gyu-bo, the great master of Baekun, "Sega Jeon-beol-yeol, Gye-chul, Bihu-hyeon"; there is a theory that Min Ching-do was a descent of Min Ja-geon (민자건, 閔子騫), one of the ten disciples of Confucius and a scholar of the Lu Dynasty. There is also a theory that the origin of the Yeoheung Min clan came from the (영월루 민굴, 마암굴 閔窟; Yeongwollu Mingul Maamgul) in Hyang-ri, Yeoju.

Considering that scholars of the Goryeo Dynasty described the Yeoheung Min clan as Hwaju (화주, 華胄), Munsoohwabeol (문수화벌, 汶水華閥), or Munsoohuye (문수후예, 汶水可裔). It is speculated that the Chinese Dongnae theory is more credible than the Mingul theory (민굴설, 閔窟說). It is considered that the Hwaju is an expression referring to the descendants of Min Ja-geon, and Mun-su (문수, 汶水) is the Analects (論語), Min Ja-geon (閔子騫) is Ogi Jae-munsu-ji-sang (오기재문수지상, 吾基在汶水之上).

The Min clan appeared in Goryeo history even before the beginning of the Joseon Dynasty like a man named Min Ga-geo (민가거, 閔可擧), who served as Sangseojwabokya (尙書左僕射) during the reigns of Hyeonjong of Goryeo and Deokjong of Goryeo. The current genealogy of the Yeoheung Min clan is from a fourth-generation descendant Min Yeong-mo (민영모, 閔令謨; 1115 - 1194); who passed the entrance exam in 1138 during King Injong's reign in order to pass the Dongjungseosirangpyeongjangsa (동중서시랑평장사, 同中書侍郞平章事), Panribusa (판리부사, 判吏部事), and the Taejataesa (태자태사, 太子太師). Because of Min Yeong-mo's achievements and assuming office in Goryeo's government, he had his great-grandfather, Min Ching-do, become the progenitor.

Goryeo Dynasty 
In the Goryeo Dynasty, the Min clan today was then known as the Hwangryeo Min clan (황려 민씨, 黃驪 閔氏) as it’s clan site at the time was called Hwangryeo-Hyeon (황려현).

Min Yeong-mo took the government exam in 1138 and was promoted to Munhasirangdongjongseomun (문하시랑동중서문하평장사) and Taejataesa oheulratgo (태자태사에 올랐고).

Min Sik (민식, 閔湜; ? - 1201) the eldest son of Min Yeong-mo, served as hyeongbusangseo (형부상서) after passing the examination during the reign of Myeongjong of Goryeo. Min Yeong-mo's second son, Min Gong-gyu (민공규, 閔公珪), lived in Panbyeongbusa and Tajasobo, and his descendants continued to produce a large number of high-ranking officials, and grew into a prestigious and aristocratic clan to which allowed them to marry into the royal family in the late Goryeo dynasty.

Min Ji (민지, 閔漬; 1248 - 1326) the great-grandson of Min Sik, assumed to the Department of Literature in 1266 during King Wonjong's reign, and became Chuseongsujeongseongnorigongsinyi (추성수정성보리공신이). The king later granted Min Ji with royal title of Internal Prince Yeoheung (여흥부원군). This eventually changed the Min clan's name from Hwangryeo (황려, 黃驪) to Yeoheung (여흥, 驪興). Thus becoming the Yeoheung Min clan (여흥 민씨, 驪興 閔氏) known today.

Joseon Dynasty 
Eventually the clan separated into distinct households. Min Sik's household was superior to Min Gong-gyu's in the number of bureaucrats discharged and the number of high-ranking officials.

In the first half of the Joseon Dynasty, the factions of each family expanded, and they were clearly distinguished into those in which families flourished and those that did not. The descendants of Min Sik, for example, the eldest son, Min Sang-jeong, and his second son, Min Sang-baek, were the great-grandsons of Min Ji's descendants.

The descendants of Min Gong-gyu, for example his great-grandson, Min Jong-yu and his eldest son Min Jeok. In particular, the family line that leads to the Min Jeok's 3rd generation descendants, Min Byeon and Min Je branch (문도공파; Mundo Gongpa), is considered the most prestigious among the Yeoheung Min clan in the early Joseon Dynasty as they produced their first Queen (Joseon's third Queen consort); Queen Wongyeong, Min Je's daughter.  

The branch from Min Yu (민유, 閔愉), Min Byeon’s older brother, held the same prestige but not as grand as his younger brother’s. But wasn’t until King Heonjong’s reign that they produced their first queen, Queen Inhyeon; a daughter from his descendant, Min Yu-jung (민유중; 1630 – 29 June 1687). They eventually produced their second and final queen (posthumously empress) during the late 19th century. 

In the early Joseon Dynasty, the Yeoheung Min clan met all the requirements such factors as close to the core of aristocratic power, such as the generation of a large number of former students and high-ranking bureaucrats centering on these families, fulfillment of public service, and the intermarriage with the royal family, as well as the prosperity of descendants. Even after the founding of the Joseon Dynasty, it has continued to maintain its status as a prestigious bongwan since the late Goryeo Dynasty.

In terms of the number of scholars, the family lines of Min Sik and Min Ji produced an overwhelming majority than the family lines of Min Gong-gyu and Min Jong-yu. But Min Jong-yu's family line was far more dominant in the generation of high-ranking officials of rank 3 or of higher ranks, which is the result of the four Min clan produced during the Joseon Dynasty.

Since one of the three queens were from the Min Gong-gyu-Min Jong-yu family line, it seems that the recruitment of relatives due to the queen's generation played a greater role in the factors for the advancement of the Min Gong-gyu-Min Jong-yu affiliates to higher positions than in the past. 

After the founding of the Joseon Dynasty, the Min Sik and Min Ji families of the Yeoheung Min clan were connected to the royal family due to the queen's maternal grandfather and thus raising the status of the family tremendously. However, the misfortunes of the descendant granddaughters from the Min Ji family line who were chosen as princesses and wives of royal court officials continued.

The four sons of Min Je, who were the core influence of the Yeoheung Min clan, were killed one after another by King Taejong's strategy to strengthen royal power and the removal of in-law's overpowering royal authority. The prestige of the Yeoheung Min clan fell for a while, but during the reign of King Sejong, their status was restored and continued to produce queens and princesses.

Throughout the Joseon Dynasty, the Yeoheung Min clan has produced 242 senior government officials, 12 Sangshin, 6 Jongmyo scholars, and two Queens: Queen Wongyeong (consort of King Taejong of Joseon and the mother of King Sejong the Great), and Queen Inhyeon (consort of King Sukjong of Joseon). 

As well as eight Princess Consorts: Princess Consort Samhanguk (Queen Wongyeong's older sister and Prince Wansan's wife), Grand Internal Princess Consort Min (Grand Prince Hoean's wife), Princess Consort Pungdeok (Prince Milseong's wife), Princess Consort Min (Prince Yang's wife), Princess Consort Min (Prince Yangwon's wife), Princess Consort Min (Heungseon Daewongun's mother), and Grand Internal Princess Consort Sunmok (Emperor Gojong's mother and Heungseon Daewongun's wife). 

The clan also had two Royal consorts throughout the dynasty: Royal Noble Consort Jeong (a concubine of King Seonjo) and Royal Consort Suk-ui (a concubine of Yeonsangun).

When the Korean Empire was proclaimed, two women of the clan were posthumously honored as empresses; Empress Myeongseong (consort and regent of Emperor Gojong and the mother of Emperor Sunjong), and Empress Sunmyeonghyo (consort of Emperor Sunjong). Empress Myeongseong is a controversial figure, who is admired for her political crafts and her determination to resist Japanese influence towards the late 19th century of the Joseon Dynasty, but also condemned for exacerbating the pervasive corruption by appointing her fellow Yeoheung Mins to important positions within the government.

See also 
 Korean clan names of foreign origin
 Min (Korean name)

References

External links 
 

 
Min clans
Korean clan names of Chinese origin